Padumlal Punnalal Buxy (27 May 1894 – 18 December 1971) was a Hindi essayist.

References 

Hindi-language writers
People from Rajnandgaon